Songs from the Big Chair is the second studio album by English pop rock band Tears for Fears, released on 25 February 1985 by Phonogram Records. The album peaked at number two in the UK and at number one in the U.S., becoming a multi-platinum seller and the band's most successful studio album to date. Songs from the Big Chair spawned the commercially successful singles "Mothers Talk", "Shout", "Everybody Wants to Rule the World", "Head over Heels" and "I Believe".

Background
The album was to be titled The Working Hour, but Roland Orzabal fought to change it to Songs from the Big Chair, a title derived from the 1976 American television film Sybil about a woman with multiple personality disorder who only feels safe when sitting in her analyst's "big chair." The title reflects the band's opinion that they were the targets of a hostile British music press. 

In an interview for the 2006 deluxe-version booklet, Curt Smith noted: "We were very introverted on The Hurting; it was a very dark album. We found the need to be more outgoing on The Big Chair."
 
The band started to generate new material around the beginning of 1984. The first song written for the album was "Head over Heels", which the band played live during a tour undertaken between the two studio albums.

While a mostly instrumental track called "The Big Chair" (which includes dialogue samples from Sybil) was released as the B-side of "Shout" in 1984, it was not included on the album (but was available on its "special limited edition" cassette version, released in the UK in 1985).

Writing and recording
The album was recorded at The Wool Hall in 1984. Conceptually and musically, it further developed the band's sound from the previous studio album The Hurting (1983), reintroducing guitars to their electronic sound and imparting a lighter approach overall. Early songs written for the album included "Head over Heels" and "The Working Hour". "Mothers Talk" was released months before the album as a single. These songs, as well as "We Are Broken", were all performed on the Tears for Fears 1983 tour. The song "Shout" became a central work during the recording of the album, and the band and producer Chris Hughes spent months working on the track.

The album's songwriting leverages many styles and influences, and progressive rock was cited as a primary influence on the album. "I Believe" was influenced by the songwriting of Robert Wyatt. "Broken" is a reworking of an earlier song and a live version is repeated at the end of "Head over Heels". The largely instrumental "Listen" has been described as a symphonic piece.

Near the end of the completion of the album, Roland Orzabal played two simple chords on his acoustic guitar that formed the foundation of the song "Everybody Wants to Rule the World". Although he was initially not interested in working on it, Orzabal was convinced to write a song based on the two chords and he added the chorus line. The song was completed in about a week and was the last track recorded for the album.

Release
Songs from the Big Chair was released on 25 February 1985 with a black and white photograph of Orzabal and Smith on the record cover.

The album reached number two on the UK Albums Chart and spawned five commercially successful singles: "Mothers Talk" (UK #14), "Shout" (UK #4), "Everybody Wants to Rule the World" (UK #2), "Head over Heels" (UK #12), and "I Believe" (UK #23). 

The radio-friendly "Everybody Wants to Rule the World" marked the band's breakthrough in the United States; both this single and its follow-up, "Shout", reached number one in the U.S. "Songs From the Big Chair" also reached number one on the Billboard 200 and sold five million copies in the U.S. alone. In the UK, the album spent 79 consecutive weeks on the album chart, remaining on the chart for 18 months until September 1986.

To mark the album's 30th anniversary, Universal Music released the album in five different formats on 10 November 2014.

Critical reception

Songs from the Big Chair received generally positive reviews. Barry McIlheney of Melody Maker wrote that "none of you should really be too surprised that Tears for Fears have made such an excellent album", calling it "an album that fully justifies the rather sneering, told-you-so looks adopted by Curt Smith and Roland Orzabal on the sleeve ... An awful lot of people will, of course, go on and on about overcoats, The Lotus Eaters and an alleged lack of depth. And an awful lot of people will have to eat an awful lot of words."

In Sounds, Johnny Waller awarded the album four and a half stars out of five and said that compared with their debut, "Tears for Fears have lovingly crafted a new masterpiece with softer, smoky vocals, more tempting melodies and less abrasive rhythms." He called the record "glorious pop" and added that "within accepted confines, Tears for Fears are stretching and growing, expanding both their imagination and their horizons."

Ian Cranna of Smash Hits described the album as "looser, more exploratory" than the band's previous work and praised its "unflinching lyrical honesty."

Rolling Stone reviewer Don Shewey found Tears for Fears reminiscent of various other acts, noting traces of "U2's social conscience, the Bunnymen's echoing guitars and XTC's contorted pop wit" but commented that Chris Hughes' "sparkling" production "nudges Songs from the Big Chair slightly ahead of the pack."

Robert Christgau of The Village Voice, noted the "uncommon command of guitar and piano, Baker Street sax, synthesizers more jagged than is deemed mete by the arbiters of dance-pop accessibility" but beneath a prevailing "portentous" mood, suggesting "a depth and drama English lads have been falling short on since the dawn of progressive rock."

In NME, Danny Kelly called Songs from the Big Chair "a calculated and brilliant peak, a quintessence of polished pop putty ... perfect at its shimmering surface, worthless to its craven core." He described it as a descendant of 10cc's The Original Soundtrack (1975) and Pink Floyd's The Dark Side of the Moon (1973)–"a product of obsessional care and attention to (often unnecessary) detail."

In a retrospective review for AllMusic, Stanton Swihart wrote that Songs from the Big Chair "heralded a dramatic maturation in the band's music, away from the synth-pop brand with which it was (unjustly) seared following the debut, and towards a complex, enveloping pop sophistication", deeming it "one of the finest statements of the decade." Mark Elliott of Record Collector said that the album found Tears for Fears "making it big, coating their consistently interesting material in a high-gloss commercial sheen that captured the mid-80s zeitgeist perfectly", while Q highlighted its "sound of spotlit, spacious sophistication plus anthemic choruses you'd bet your house on." Writing for Stylus Magazine in 2006, Andrew Unterberger concluded that "even today, when all rock musicians seem to be able to do is be emotional and honest, the brutality and power of Songs from the Big Chairs catharsis is still quite shocking."

Songs from the Big Chair was included in the book 1001 Albums You Must Hear Before You Die. Slant Magazine ranked the record at number 95 on its list of the best albums of the 1980s.

In February 2020, the album was the focus of an episode of the BBC's Classic Albums documentary series. The episode includes new interviews with key personnel including Orzabal, Smith, Ian Stanley, producer Chris Hughes, engineer Dave Bascombe, Oleta Adams, John Grant and A&R man David Bates.

Track listing

Personnel
Tears for Fears
 Roland Orzabal – vocals, keyboards, guitars, synth bass (1), LinnDrum programming (1), grand piano (5)
 Curt Smith – vocals, bass guitar, synth bass (3) 
 Ian Stanley – keyboards, LinnDrum programming, arrangements (8)
 Manny Elias – drums (2-7), drum arrangement (2)

Additional personnel
 "Shout": Chris Hughes – drums, Sandy McLelland – backing vocals
 "The Working Hour": Andy Davis – grand piano, Mel Collins – saxophone, Will Gregory – saxophone solos, Jerry Marotta – percussion and saxophone arrangements
 "Everybody Wants to Rule the World": Neil Taylor – second guitar solo, Chris Hughes – LinnDrum and MIDI programming
 "Mothers Talk": Stevie Lange – backing vocals
 "I Believe": Will Gregory – saxophone
 "Broken": Neil Taylor – guitar solo
 "Head Over Heels":  Andy Davis – grand piano, Marilyn Davis – backing vocals, Annie McCaig – backing vocals, Sandy McLelland – backing vocals
 "Listen": Marilyn Davis – operatic vocal

 "The Big Chair": samples dialogue from the film Sybil (1976)

Production
 Chris Hughes – producer
 Dave Bascombe – engineer
 Tim O'Sullivan – cover photography
 Paul King – management

Charts

Weekly charts

Year-end charts

Certifications and sales

Notes

References

Bibliography

External links
 

1985 albums
Albums produced by Chris Hughes (musician)
Fontana Records albums
Mercury Records albums
Progressive pop albums
Tears for Fears albums